Alan M. MacEachren (born 1952) is an American geographer, Professor of Geography and Director, GeoVISTA Center, Department of Geography, The Pennsylvania State University. He is known for his cross-disciplinary work in the fields of human-centered geographic visualization, scientific and information visualization, and in statistics.

Biography 
Alan MacEachren received a B.A. in geography in 1974 at the Ohio University, an M.A. in geography in 1976 from the University of Kansas and a Ph.D. in geography 1979 from University of Kansas.

From 1979 to 1983, he was Assistant Professor of Geography at the Virginia Polytechnic Institute and State University and Director of the Department of Geography Cartography Laboratory. From 1980 to 1983, he was Director of the Department of Geography Spatial Analysis Laboratory, Virginia Polytechnic Institute and State University. In 1983, he became Assistant Professor of Geography at the University of Colorado-Boulder and in 1985 switched to Associate Professor of Geography and Director of the Deasy GeoGraphics Laboratory at the Pennsylvania State University, where he worked until 1992. From 1992 he was Professor of Geography, and since 1998 Director, GeoVISTA Center, Department of Geography, Penn State University. In Fall 2007 he was Visiting Professor, Department of Computer Science, Stanford University, and since 2007 also Affiliate Professor of Information Sciences and Technology, Penn State University.

Awards for Alan MacEachren in 2004-2007 include the E. Willard and Ruby S. Miller Professor of Geography, College of Earth and Mineral Science, Penn State University. He became an Honorary Fellow of the International Cartographic Association in 2005, making him only the sixth Fellow from the U.S. since 1974. In 2004, he was also recognized for Exceptional Scholarly Contributions to the Practice of Cartography, by the Canadian Cartographic Association.

See also 
 2.5D
 Animated mapping
 Figure-ground in map design
 History of cartography
 Spatial analysis
 Theresa-Marie Rhyne

Publications 
Alan MacEachren has written several books and articles. A selection:
 1994. Visualization in modern cartography. With D.R. Fraser (ed.). Taylor.  
 1995. How maps work : representation, visualization, and design   How maps work : representation, 
 1994. Some truth with maps : a primer on symbolization and design 
 1997. Rediscovering Geography: New Relevance for the New Century. With 13 other authors. Washington, D. C.: National Academy of Science Press.
 2005. Exploring Geovisualization. With Jason Dykes and M.J. Kraak. International Cartographic Association.
 2005. Illuminating the Path: The Research and Development Agenda for Visual Analytics. With 25 other authors. Pacific Northwest National Laboratory and Department of Homeland Security.

References

External links 

 Alan M. MacEachren. Director, GeoVISTA Center. The Pennsylvania State University.  
 List of Influences: Alan MacEachren by Robert Kosara, 2007-04-03.

1952 births
American geographers
Historians of cartography
Living people
Information visualization experts